The Outside Story is an 2020 American comedy-drama film written and directed by Casimir Nozkowski. It stars Brian Tyree Henry, Sunita Mani, Sonequa Martin-Green, Olivia Edward, Asia Kate Dillon, Maria Dizzia and Rebecca Naomi Jones.

It premiered at Rooftop Films on August 1, 2020. It was released on April 30, 2021 by Samuel Goldwyn Films.

Plot
While tipping a delivery man, reclusive Charles accidentally leaves his keys in his apartment and finds himself locked out. The inconvenience soon turns into a day of befriending neighbors he had never met, reflecting on his recent breakup, and exploring his feelings and values.

Cast
 Brian Tyree Henry as Charles Young
 Sonequa Martin-Green as Isha
 Asia Kate Dillon as Inez
 Sunita Mani as Slater
 Olivia Edward as Elena
 Michael Cyril Creighton as Andre
 Maria Dizzia as Juliet
 Rebecca Naomi Jones as Amy
 Matthew Maher as Neil
 Hannah Bos as Paige
 Jordan Carlos as Delivery Guy
 David Zayas as Tony
 Nadia Bowers as Sylvia
 Lynda Gravatt as Sara

Production
In August 2018, it was announced Brian Tyree Henry had joined the film's cast, with Casimir Nozkowski directing from his screenplay. Frank Hall Green, Brian Newman, Joseph Stephans and Nozkowski would produce the film, while Evan Thayer and Cameron O'Reilly as executive producers under their Greenmachine Film and Bayard Productions film banners, respectively. In November 2018, Sonequa Martin-Green, Asia Kate Dillon, Sunita Mani, Olivia Edward, Michael Cyril Creighton, Maria Dizzia, Rebecca Naomi Jones, Matthew Maher, Hannah Bos and Jordan Carlos joined the cast. Production began that week.

Release
The Outside Story was scheduled to premiere at the Tribeca Film Festival on April 18, 2020, but the festival was postponed due to the COVID-19 pandemic. It premiered instead at Rooftop Films on August 1, 2020. In February 2021, Samuel Goldwyn Films acquired U.S. distribution rights, and set it for an April 30, 2021 release.

Reception
The Outside Story received positive reviews from film critics. The site's critical consensus reads, "A refreshingly optimistic look at urban community life, The Outside Story is further distinguished by a layered leading performance from Brian Tyree Henry." On Metacritic, the film holds a rating of 63 out of 100, based on 5 critics, indicating "generally favorable reviews".

References

External links
 
 
 

2020 films
American comedy-drama films
2020 comedy-drama films
2020 directorial debut films
Samuel Goldwyn Films films
2020s English-language films
2020s American films
English-language comedy-drama films